Achatinella bellula is a species of air-breathing land snail, a terrestrial pulmonate gastropod mollusk in the family Achatinellidae. This species is endemic to the Hawaiian island of Oahu in the United States. No more than five specimens have been observed since 1979.

References

bellula
Biota of Oahu
Molluscs of Hawaii
Endemic fauna of Hawaii
Critically endangered fauna of the United States
Taxonomy articles created by Polbot
ESA endangered species